Huey Lewis and the News is the  debut album by American rock band Huey Lewis and the News, released in 1980.

Background
In 1979, the band's name was Huey Lewis and the American Express. Under this name they released a single and secured their recording contract with Chrysalis Records at the end of the year. The album was recorded within three weeks and the producer was Bill Schnee, who had produced for Boz Scaggs and Pablo Cruise.

Chrysalis did not like the addition 'American Express' to the band's name, fearing that the credit card company of the same name could sue them. In January 1980, the band changed their name to 'Huey Lewis and the News'.

The album reached No. 203 on the Billboard album chart. Prior to the album's release, the track "Who Cares?" was used in the 1979 motion picture Rock 'n' Roll High School.

Reception

Billboard states that producer Bill Schnee mastered the "clean, sparse rock" that every rock band was trying to achieve at the time by "skinning the uptempo, light rockers down to basic guitars and vocals." Stephen Thomas Erlewine, in a retrospective review for AllMusic, says the News turn out "hard-driving covers and originals in a workmanlike fashion" but their "debut suffers from an uneven selection of material."

Record World called the lead single "Some of My Lies Are True (Sooner or Later)" a "fun rocker" in which "the driving rhythm guitars buttress strong lead and harmony vocals."

Track listing

Singles
"Some of My Lies Are True (Sooner or Later)" was written in San Francisco by the band and recorded in Los Angeles within three weeks, and the track was released as the album's first single. The song is about people betraying other people, including friends, old friends, and enemies.

The B-side for the single was "Don't Ever Tell Me That You Love Me". The songs failed to chart, despite early support from the then-brand-new channel MTV.

Videos were shot for both songs and were later included on the band's 1985 VHS compilation, Video Hits. In 1986, remixes of the songs were included as B-sides to the singles "Hip to Be Square" and "Stuck with You", respectively.

A live recording of the song "Trouble in Paradise" was later included on the charity album We Are the World.

Personnel 
 Huey Lewis – vocals, harmonica
 Chris Hayes – lead guitar, backing vocals
 Johnny Colla – rhythm guitar, saxophone, backing vocals
 Mario Cipollina – bass
 Bill Gibson – drums, percussion, backing vocals
 Sean Hopper – keyboards, backing vocals

Production 
 Bill Schnee – producer, engineer, mixing
 Kirk Butler – assistant engineer
 Bill Cooper – assistant engineer
 Tim Dennen – assistant engineer
 Studio 55 (Los Angeles, California) – mixing location 
 Doug Sax – mastering at The Mastering Lab (Hollywood, California)
 Billy Bass – art direction, cover concept
 Rod Dyer – design
 Bill Murphy – design
 Ron Slenzak – photography
 Chris Welch – liner notes
 Bob Brown – management

References

1980 debut albums
Huey Lewis and the News albums
Albums produced by Bill Schnee
Chrysalis Records albums